Asiorrhina is a genus of long-beaked fungus gnats in the family Lygistorrhinidae.

Species
Asiorrhina asiatica (Senior-White, 1922)
Asiorrhina parasiatica (Blagoderov, 2009)

References

Sciaroidea genera